Bir Bhadra Thapa or Birabhadra Thapa also spelled Virabhadra or Virbhadra, was a politician, courtier and military officer in the Gorkha Kingdom during the 18th century. Born in medieval Tanahun Kingdom, he left his ancestral property there and migrated into the uprising Gorkha Kingdom. He got entry into the minor ranks of military of King Prithvi Narayan Shah due to being a nephew of Sura Prabha, the wife of military commander Shivaram Singh Basnyat of the Basnyat dynasty. Thereafter, he took part in the various battles of Unification of Nepal throughout his life. Among his grandsons, Bhimsen Thapa went on to become the Mukhtiyar of Nepal (equivalent to Prime Minister) for 31 years and founder of Thapa dynasty.

Family 

Birbhadra belonged to the prominent Bagale Thapa clan of Jumla that migrated eastwards as per Gorkha chronicles. The Thapa genealogy states that Birbhadra was a grandson of Bikram Thāpā and son of Bijay (Bijai) Thāpā. However, the Sardari annual reinstatement letter of his youngest son Amar Singh Thapa (sanu) on Chaitra 1855 B.S. mentioned Amar Singh Thapa (Sanu) as grandson of Bikram Thapa and son of Birbhadra Thapa. Thus, historian Baburam Acharya contends that Bijai Thāpā was an imaginary figure. Similarly, the Sundhara Inscription of his grandson Bhimsen Thapa, also further validates the point that Birbhadra was the son of Bikram Thapa. 

He was the patron of leading Thapa Chhetri group (i.e. Thapa dynasty) in the Royal Court. He had three sons; Jeevan Thapa, Bangsha Raj Thapa and Amar Singh Thapa (sanu). His eldest son died in the Battle of Kantipur with powerful Kaji Kalu Pande. The seven sons of Amar Singh Thapa (sanu) - Bhimsen Thapa, Nain Singh Thapa, Bakhtawar Singh Thapa, Amrit Singh Thapa and Ranabir Singh Thapa, all participated and contributed in the expansion and unification of Nepal.

Career

King Prithvi Narayan Shah's first military commander Shivaram Singh Basnyat was married to Sura Prabha, a sister of Bikram Thapa and an aunt of Birbhadra. Therefore, he came from Tanahun Kingdom to Gorkha Kingdom leaving all his ancestral property there due to his close family relations with Shivaram Singh. Another factor to attribute to this migration was the uprising fame and attraction of Gorkha Kingdom. Birbhadra, being a nephew of Shivaram Singh's wife Sura Prabha, was easily recruited into the minor ranks of Jamadar in the army of the Gorkha Kingdom. But by the last period of King Prithvi Narayan's reign, his name was written at the foremost in one of the royal letters. 

When King Prithvi Narayan Shah annexed Nuwakot in 1744, he was one of the influential Bharadars. After the conquest of Naldum area, he along with Commander Shivaram Singh Basnyat conquered Sanga, Panauti, Sankhu and adjacent areas. The Gorkhali chronicle states that he was the commander of the Gorkhali forces. He commanded the Gorkhali troops during the capture of Kavre and Palanchowk with fellow commanders Chautariya Daljit Shah and Kaji Harka (Harsh) Pantha. He was deployed to Kaski allowing two Brahmins from there to reside in Kathmandu as a part of friendly diplomacy with the Kaski Kingdom. He commanded troops near the hill in Sindhuli against the English advance of Major Kinloch.

Birbhadra was also among the guarantors to the ex-King Rana Bahadur Shah who took a debt from Seth Dwarikadas on 1860 B.S. during ex-King Rana Bahadur's exiled life in Banaras.

References

Sources

Further reading

Nepalese military personnel
Thapa Kaji
Bagale Thapa
People of the Nepalese unification
People from Gorkha District
Nepalese Hindus